The Colombia national futsal team represents Colombia in international futsal competitions. It is overseen by the Colombian Football Federation in FIFA competitions and by the Fecolfutsal in AMF competitions.

The team's most notable performance in the FIFA Futsal World Cup was at the 2012 FIFA Futsal World Cup in Thailand, where they achieved fourth place. In the Copa América, the regional competition, the best results of the team were achieving fourth place in 2011 and 2015. In the AMF Futsal World Cup, the team was champion three times: 2000, 2011 and 2015. The team was also champion in the 2014 South American Futsal Championship.

Competitive record 
*Draws include knockout matches decided on penalty kicks.
**Gold background colour indicates that the tournament was won.
***Red border colour indicates tournament was held on home soil.

 Champions   Runners-up  Third Place   Fourth place

AMF

AMF Futsal World Cup

FIFA

FIFA Futsal World Cup

Copa América de Futsal

FIFA Futsal World Cup qualification (CONMEBOL)/CONMEBOL Preliminary Competition

Liga Sudamericana de Futsal

1North zone.

Futsal Confederations Cup

Grand Prix de Futsal

Results and fixtures

FIFA

2018

Current squad

FIFA 
The following 14 players were named for the 2016 FIFA Futsal World Cup.

Colombia national under-20 futsal team 
The Colombia national under-20 futsal team participates in FIFA' South American Under-20 Futsal Championship since its first edition in 2004. The best result of the team is to reach the final three consecutive editions (in 2010, 2013 and 2014). Since 2017, they participate in the Liga Sudamericana de Futsal (as an Under-19 team).

FIFA

South American Under-20 Futsal Championship 
*Draws include knockout matches decided on penalty kicks.
**Gold background colour indicates that the tournament was won.
***Red border colour indicates tournament was held on home soil.

 Champions   Runners-up  Third Place   Fourth place

Liga Sudamericana de Futsal

1North zone.

AMF

AMF Under-20 Futsal World Cup

Colombia national under-18 futsal team 
The Colombia national under-18 futsal team participated in the second edition of the South American Under-18 Futsal Championship held in 2018.

South American Under-18 Futsal Championship 
*Draws include knockout matches decided on penalty kicks.
**Gold background colour indicates that the tournament was won.
***Red border colour indicates tournament was held on home soil.

 Champions   Runners-up  Third Place   Fourth place

Honours

FIFA
FIFA Futsal World Cup:
 Fourth place (1): 2012
Copa América:
 Fourth place (2): 2011, 2015
Futsal Confederations Cup:
 Runners-up (1): 2013
Grand Prix de Futsal:
 Runners-up (2): 2005, 2014
 Third place (1): 2015
Bolivarian Games: 
 Champions (2): 2009 Sucre, 2017 Santa Marta
 Runners-up (1): 2013 Trujillo
South American Games:
 Champions (1): 2018 Cochabamba
 Third place (2): 2010 Medellín, 2014 Santiago

AMF
AMF Futsal World Cup:
 Champions (3): 2000, 2011, 2015
 Runners-up (2): 1994, 2003
 Third place (1): 2007
 Fourth place (1): 1982
South American Futsal Championship:
 Champions (1): 2014
 Runners-up (1): 1998
 Third place (1): 1977
Pan-American Futsal Championship:
 Champions (2): 1990, 1993
 Runners-up (1): 1996
 Third place (2): 1984, 1999
World Games:
 Champions (1): 2013 Cali

See also
Colombia women's national futsal team

References

External links
 FIFA
 CONMEBOL

Colombia
National sports teams of Colombia
Futsal in Colombia